Petra Polnišová (born 24 February 1976) is a Slovak actress and stand-up comedian. She is the holder of six OTO Awards.

Awards

References
General

Specific

External links 

 Petra Polnišová at ČSFd
 Petra Polnišová at IMDb
 Petra Polnišová at KinoBox
 Petra Polnišová at SFd

1976 births
Living people
Actors from Bratislava
Slovak stage actresses
Slovak film actresses
Slovak television actresses
21st-century Slovak actresses
Slovak comedians